The media of Puerto Rico includes local radio stations, television stations and newspapers; for the majority of all these the language is Spanish. There are also three stations of the US Armed Forces Radio and Television Service.

Newspapers

Magazines

Radio stations
Radio transmission first began in Puerto Rico on December 3, 1922 with WKAQ (AM), making it the first radio broadcasting station on the island and the fifth in the world. Its purpose was to transmit news and weather updates with commercials. By 1937, the advertising industry had entered radio on the Island; and by the year 1942, there were five radio broadcasting stations in Puerto Rico. These five stations were based in San Juan, Ponce and Mayagüez. 

There are currently over one hundred and forty radio stations being broadcast in Puerto Rico as of March 1st, 2019. These radio stations broadcast in different formats, some of the most popular being religious, news/talk, and music. The city of San Juan currently transmits more radio stations than any other city in Puerto Rico. Ponce and Mayagüez also remain popular locations for radio transmission. 

Radio transmission in Puerto Rico was highly interrupted during Hurricane Maria.  After Hurricane Maria had passed, there was a spike in radio use in Puerto Rico, as it served as a main source of news information after the natural disaster.

The following radio stations transmit from Puerto Rico:

Television stations

Television stars

See also

 Puerto Rican literature
Media of the United States

Bibliography

in English
   + FM Stations on the Air: Puerto Rico

in Spanish
 
 
  (About freedom of the press)
 
  
  (Essays)
 
  (Covers 1930s-1980s)

External links